"Body Back" is a song by American DJ and producer Gryffin featuring Swedish singer Maia Wright. It was released on October 18, 2019 from his studio album Gravity. The song co-wrote by Bebe Rexha, Lauren Christy, Gryffin, Mitch Allan, Pär Westerlund and produced by Gryffin, Mitch Allan, Mark Ralph.

Charts

Weekly charts

Year-end charts

Certifications

References

2019 singles
2019 songs
Gryffin songs
Songs written by Bebe Rexha
Songs written by Lauren Christy
Songs written by Mitch Allan